The 1958 United States Senate election in Delaware took place on November 4, 1958. Incumbent Republican U.S. Senator John J. Williams was narrowly re-elected to a third term in office over Democratic former Governor Elbert Carvel.

General election

Candidates
Elbert Carvel, former Governor of Delaware (Democratic)
John J. Williams, incumbent U.S. Senator since 1947 (Republican)

Results

See also 
 1958 United States Senate elections

References

Delaware
1958
1958 Delaware elections